Eugénie Élise Vergin sometimes also known under the name Élise Colonne or Alice Colonne (21 March 1864 – 16 November 1941) was a French singer and singing teacher.

Life 
Born in Lille, Vergin entered the Conservatoire de Paris in 1873 where she won the first prizes in singing and opéra-comique in 1875. Later, she snag at concerts of the Association Artistique du Châtelet recently founded by Édouard Colonne where her performance of the role of Marguerite in Berlioz's La Damnation de Faust on 17 November 1878 was particularly acclaimed.

On 30 September 1886, she married Édouard Colonne.

Vergine Collone was known for her excellent musicality. She was in great demand as a singing teacher in Paris where she founded a successful singing school. Vera Nimidoff, Judith Lasalle were her pupils.

Awards 
 Chevalier of the Légion d'honneur (1929)
 Officier of the Ordre des Arts et des Lettres (1890); Officier de l’instruction publique (1898)

References

External links 

1864 births
1941 deaths
Musicians from Lille
20th-century French women opera singers
Voice teachers
Conservatoire de Paris alumni
Officiers of the Ordre des Palmes Académiques
Chevaliers of the Légion d'honneur